Abdullo Rahimbayevich Rakhimbayev (June 1, 1896 – May 7, 1938) also spelled Abdullo Raximboyevich Raximboyev, was an ethnic Uzbek, Tajik-born Soviet politician. He was born in Khujand in modern Tajikistan. He was a recipient of the Order of Lenin. He served on the Central Executive Committee of the Soviet Union as representative of the Tajik Soviet Socialist Republic from January 1934 to September 1937. He was arrested and executed during the Great Purge. After the death of Joseph Stalin, he was rehabilitated.

References

1896 births
1938 deaths
Uzbek revolutionaries
Recipients of the Order of Lenin
People from Khujand
People from Samarkand Oblast
Great Purge victims from Tajikistan 
People executed by the Soviet Union
Soviet rehabilitations
Heads of government of the Tajik Soviet Socialist Republic